Arabidiol synthase (PEN1 (gene), (S)-squalene-2,3-epoxide hydro-lyase (arabidiol forming)) is an enzyme with systematic name (3S)-2,3-epoxy-2,3-dihydrosqualene hydro-lyase (arabidiol forming). This enzyme catalyses the following chemical reaction

 arabidiol  (3S)-2,3-epoxy-2,3-dihydrosqualene + H2O

The reaction occurs in the reverse direction.

References

External links 
 

EC 4.2.1